Tasnuva Tisha (born 8 December) is a Bangladeshi actress and model. She is known for acting in Opekkha web series and many TV dramas.

Early life 
Tasnuva Tisha was born on 8 December. Her father is a businessman and mother is a housewife. She studied at Shamsul Haq Khan School and College then enrolled at Eden College and graduated from there. Bayazid bin Wahid and Tamanna Tanzia is her siblings. She is a resident of Banasree, a residential area in Dhaka.

Career 
Tasnuva Tisha started her modeling career in 2013. She started her acting career with Mostafa Kamal Raj's TV drama Lal Kham Vs Neel Kham. In 2020, She worked with Manoj Kumar Pramanik in an advertisement for Banglalink. She advertised for Royal Cafe. Her music video "Tumi Eto Bhalo Ken" was released on February 18, 2020. She starred with Sumit Sengupta in another music video called 'Pure Love'.

Her notable TV dramas and telefilms are 'Ekdin Chutti Chahe', 'Off Screen', 'Love Guru Dotcom', 'Dost Dushman', 'Jhalmuri', 'Prem Karte Ichchhuk', 'Love Loss', 'Apeksha', 'A'. What a game ',' I want you ',' A little ',' I remember ',' I remember ',' Story of Arup ',' Hi Zvin ',' Go tell the bird ',' To new address ',' Pull of mind ',' Feelings', 'Favorite Communication', 'Avengers and the Great Loser', 'Goodnight', 'Mind in Mind', 'Fairy tale for Cloud Girl', 'You are a star in the sky', 'River of some oblivion', 'You are a stranger' etc.

She starred in many web series such as August 14, Vacation of Doubt, Out of Network etc. In 2021, she starred in a web film called Batch 2003. He also starred in a film called Chal

Personal life 
Ishrat Ryan is her ex-husband. They have a daughter named Oishee who is the first child of Tasnuva. Her second husband is Farzanul Haque to whom she married on 14 February 2015. They have a son named Faraj Mutazzim Anush. But they divorced on May 21, 2016.

Television

Awards

References 

Year of birth missing (living people)
Living people
21st-century Bangladeshi actors
Bangladeshi models
Eden Mohila College alumni